Vacronini is a tribe of darkling beetles in the subfamily Pimeliinae of the family Tenebrionidae. There are at least four genera in Vacronini.

Genera
These genera belong to the tribe Vacronini
 Alaephus Horn, 1870  (North America)
 Eupsophulus Cockerell, 1906  (North America)
 Exangeltus Blackburn, 1897  (Australasia)
 Lixionica Blackburn, 1896  (Australasia)

References

Further reading

 
 

Tenebrionoidea